The Big Shaheen Cabin, in the Admiralty Island National Monument near Angoon, Alaska, is a historic log cabin that was built by the Civilian Conservation Corps in 1935.  It was listed on the National Register of Historic Places in 1995;  the listing included the cabin and three other contributing structures.

It was built as part of the Admiralty Island Civilian Conservation Corps Canoe Route.  The cabin is made of  logs and its gable roof has a six-foot overhang at the front to make a porch.  There are three "culturally modified" trees in the area.

See also
National Register of Historic Places listings in Hoonah–Angoon Census Area, Alaska

References

1935 establishments in Alaska
Civilian Conservation Corps in Alaska
Houses completed in 1935
Log cabins in the United States
Buildings and structures on the National Register of Historic Places in Hoonah–Angoon Census Area, Alaska
Park buildings and structures on the National Register of Historic Places in Alaska
Tongass National Forest
Log buildings and structures on the National Register of Historic Places in Alaska